Maria Leonor "Leni" Gerona Robredo (born Maria Leonor Santo Tomas Gerona; April 23, 1965) is a Filipino lawyer and politician who served as the 14th vice president of the Philippines from 2016 to 2022.

She was the wife of the late Jesse Robredo, who was interior secretary from 2010 until his death in 2012. A long-time human rights lawyer and social activist, she eventually ran for public office and was elected in 2013 as the 3rd district representative of Camarines Sur, her home province. She served in this position for three years, writing legislation on agrarian reform, people empowerment, and anti-corruption. She then assumed the vice presidency in 2016, after winning that year's election. Robredo defeated Bongbong Marcos, son of the ousted dictator and kleptocrat Ferdinand Marcos, by a narrow margin of 263,473 votes. Bongbong Marcos protested the results, alleging that her party, the Liberal Party, had manipulated the votes. However, the Supreme Court found no evidence of fraud and even reported that her actual lead over Marcos was higher at 278,566. Robredo is the second woman to serve as vice president of the Philippines, after Gloria Macapagal Arroyo, and the first vice president from the Bicol Region.

Robredo has spearheaded multiple programs in the Office of the Vice President (OVP); her flagship anti-poverty program, Angat Buhay, has helped address key areas including education, rural development, and healthcare, in partnership with more than 300 organizations. During the COVID-19 pandemic in the Philippines, the OVP under Robredo responded by providing free shuttle services for frontline workers, swab tests, telehealth services, and raised funds for relief operations across the country. Robredo was awarded by the government of Thailand in 2016 for her work and advocacy in women's empowerment and gender equality. Under her leadership, the OVP also received the ISO 9001: 2015 certification for the office's quality management systems.

During her vice presidency, she served as the chair of the Liberal Party and de facto leader of the opposition to President Rodrigo Duterte's administration, where she was appointed by Duterte and briefly served as the chair of the Housing and Urban Development Coordinating Council and the co-chairperson of the Inter-Agency Committee on Anti-Illegal Drugs. She has received backlash from government supporters for her being staunchly critical to Duterte's policies such as the war on drugs, counter-insurgency initiatives, COVID-19 pandemic response, and soft stance toward China. She has been a constant target of disinformation, with many articles making false claims about her personal life to discredit her.

Robredo ran for president as an independent candidate in the 2022 Philippine presidential election with Liberal Party leader Senator Francis Pangilinan as her running mate. Her campaign, which centered on thwarting another Marcos regime, was noted for the strength of its volunteers and the attendance in its rallies, her popularity among the younger generation. Robredo lost the election, placing second with 15,035,773 votes; her campaign has been observed to have been affected by disinformation against her, as well as her lack of political machinery.

Early life and education
Maria Leonor Santo Tomas Gerona was born on April 23, 1965, in Naga, Camarines Sur, Philippines. She was the first of three children born to Naga City Regional Trial Court Judge Antonio Gerona (c. 1933–2013) and Salvacion Santo Tomas (1936–2020).

Robredo attended the basic education department of Universidad de Sta. Isabel in Naga, graduating from elementary school in 1978, and from high school in 1982. She earned her degree in Bachelor of Arts in Economics from the University of the Philippines School of Economics at UP Diliman in 1986, and proceeded to study law at the University of Nueva Caceres, graduating in 1992. She passed the bar exams in 1997.

Gerona chose to temporarily forego law studies and instead decided to work as a researcher for the Bicol River Basin Development Program (BRBDP), a government agency tasked with integrated area development planning in the three provinces of the Bicol Region. Here she met then-program director Jesse Robredo, who would eventually become her husband.

Having passed the bar on her second attempt in 1996 and admitted in May 1997, Robredo served in the Public Attorney's Office, a role in which she often took up the defense for cases pursued by her husband, who by then had become Mayor of Naga.

From 1998 to 2008, Robredo became the coordinator of Sentro ng Alternatibong Lingap Panligan (SALIGAN), a Naga-based alternative legal support group. SALIGAN's work aimed to encourage young legal professionals to take on leadership roles, and involved visiting distant rural communities to provide legal services to residents who would otherwise have little or no access to such services, as well as conducting legal advocacy by proposing amendments and new laws based on the needs of these marginalized communities. Later, the group's focus shifted to include helping rural women to acquire capital in order to participate in competitive markets.

In addition, Robredo founded the Lakas ng Kababaihan ng Naga Federation, an organization that provides training and livelihood opportunities for women, in 1989.

In 2012, Robredo was named the chairperson of the Liberal Party in Camarines Sur.

Political career

Congressional career 

Robredo ran in Camarines Sur's 3rd congressional district during the Philippine general elections of 2013. On May 16, 2013, she was proclaimed winner, beating Nelly Favis-Villafuerte (of Nationalist People's Coalition/United Nationalist Alliance), wife of former Congressman Luis Villafuerte and member of the politically powerful Villafuerte dynasty.

During her term in congress, Robredo was the vice chairman of the House committees on good governance, public accountability, and revision of laws, and a member of 11 other house panels. She was known for being a strong advocate of the Freedom of Information Act, and a strong supporter of the Bangsamoro Basic Law.

Participatory governance and transparency were the major objectives and thrusts of Robredo's legislative agenda. The first law Robredo authored in congress was the Full Disclosure Policy Bill (HB 19), which would have mandated all government agencies and their sub-units and projects to disclose their budget and financial transactions in a conspicuous manner "without any requests from the public." Concerned that the marginalized sector should not be denied access to government frontline services and public meetings based on their attire, she sponsored the Open Door Policy Act (House Bill No. 6286), which prohibits government offices and agencies from implementing strict dress codes.

Robredo also authored the People Empowerment Bill (HB 4911), which sought to allow more participation from Filipinos in decision and policy-making, and the Participatory Budget Process Bill (HB 3905), which sought to increase participation in budget-related decisions in government projects by locals. She also wrote the Comprehensive Anti-Discrimination Bill (HB 3432) to prohibit discrimination on the basis of ethnicity, race, religion or belief, sex, gender, sexual orientation, gender identity and expressions, language, disability, HIV status, etc.

To promote transparency in the taxation process, she sponsored the house version (House Bill 05831) of what would eventually become Republic Act RA10708, the Tax Incentives Management and Transparency Act of 2009 (TIMTA).

Other major legislation co-authored by Robredo includes the Anti-Dynasty Bill and the Healthy Beverage Options Act (House Bill 4021).

Legislative portfolio
As a member of the 16th Congress, Robredo was one of the principal authors of the house version of "The Tax Incentives Management and Transparency Act (TIMTA)" (Republic Act RA10708, House Bill 05831), which was enacted on December 9, 2015. She also co-authored the house version of the following laws: the “National Children’s Month Act,” Republic Act RA10661 (HB01641) enacted on May 29, 2015, declaring the celebration of the national children's month on November of every year; the "Charter of the Quezon City Development Authority," Republic Act RA10646 (HB03899), lapsed into law on November 8, 2014; the "Open High School System Act," Republic Act RA10665 (HB04085) enacted on July 9, 2015, establishing and appropriating funds for the open high school system; Republic Act RA10638 (HB04089), extending the corporate life of the Philippine National Railways for another 50 years, enacted on June 16, 2014; Republic Act RA10707 (HB04147), amending the "Probation Law of 1976" enacted on November 26, 2015, rationalizing and strengthening the probation system; the "Graphic Health Warnings Law," Republic Act RA10643 (HB04590), enacted on November 15, 2014, prescribing the printing of graphic health warnings on tobacco products; Republic Act RA10655 (HB05280), decriminalizing premature remarriages, enacted on March 13, 2015; and the "Sangguniang Kabataan Reform Act.of 2015," Republic Act RA10742 (HB06043), enacted on January 15, 2016.

In addition, Robredo was one of many co-authors of the National Budgets for the years 2014 (RA10633, HB02630, enacted on December 20, 2013), 2015 (RA10651, HB04968, enacted on December 23, 2014), and 2016 (RA10717, HB06132, enacted on December 22, 2015).

Robredo was also a key supporter of: HB 4911: People Empowerment Bill to create a partnership between local governments and civil society through the establishment of a people's council in every local government unit. This act also prescribes the powers and functions of said council; HB 3432: Comprehensive Anti-Discrimination to prohibit discrimination on the basis of ethnicity, race, religion or belief, sex, gender, sexual orientation, gender identity and expressions, language, disability, HIV status, and other status, and provide penalties for these; HB 4021: Healthy Beverage Options to regulate the availability of beverages to children in schools and for other purposes; HB 19: Full Disclosure Policy to require the full disclosure of all information on fiscal management from all national government departments, bureaus, agencies, and other instrumentalities, including government-owned or controlled corporations and their subsidiaries and local governments. This act will also provide penalties for violations of said requirements; HB 3905: Participatory Budget Process to institutionalize citizens’ participation in the budget process and for other processes; and HB 3237: Freedom of Information to strengthen the right of citizens to information held by the government.

Vice Presidency (2016-2022)

On October 5, 2015, after her three daughters set aside their initial objections, Robredo announced that she would run for the post of Vice President of the Philippines under the Liberal Party in the 2016 election, as the running mate of presidential candidate Mar Roxas. Robredo won the election with 14,418,817 votes, or 35.11 percent of cast ballots, narrowly defeating her closest rival, Senator Ferdinand Marcos, Jr, by 263,473 votes or by 0.64 percent.

Robredo was sworn in as vice president of the Philippines on June 30, 2016, at the Quezon City Reception House, which she had since used as her office.

Robredo first met President Rodrigo Duterte personally at the Armed Forces of the Philippines change-of-command ceremonies at Camp Aguinaldo on July 1, 2016, a day after their inauguration. She later paid a courtesy call on him at Malacañang Palace on July 4, their first formal meeting. On July 7, Duterte called Robredo during a press conference to offer her the cabinet position of head of the Housing and Urban Development Coordinating Council, which Robredo accepted. Robredo is the third vice president to head the government agency focused on housing programs, following her immediate predecessors Noli de Castro and Jejomar Binay. Duterte earlier said that he did not want to appoint a cabinet position to Robredo due to his unfamiliarity with her and his friendship with Marcos.

On December 4, 2016, Robredo was informed by Cabinet Secretary Leoncio Evasco Jr. "to desist from attending all Cabinet meetings starting December 5", which prompted her to release a statement tendering her resignation as the chairwoman of the Housing and Urban Development Coordinating Council, effective the following day.

In March 2017, Robredo sent a video appeal to the United Nations in which she claimed that the Philippine National Police had unwritten policies in its operations in the drug war, where family members of drug peddlers were allegedly being held hostage and relatives of drug users and pushers wanted by the police were being killed. Robredo's message to a side meeting of the UN Commission on Narcotic Drugs annual meeting in Vienna last March 16 stirred a political firestorm as it coincided with the filing by Magdalo Rep. Gary Alejano of the first impeachment case against President Duterte. Robredo also claimed of a "palit ulo" (head swapping) scheme, where police allegedly rounded up families of accused drug personalities to demand for their relatives to be taken in exchange for the accused drug personalities if they could not be found. Citing a lack of evidence to the claims, a group of lawyers and academics filed an impeachment attempt against Robredo for allegedly "betraying her oath to defend the country." The impeachment campaign against her was rejected by Duterte himself, and never gained traction due to a lack of endorsement from the House of Representatives.

On November 4, 2019, Duterte assigned Robredo to be co-chairperson of the Inter-Agency Committee on Anti-Illegal Drugs (ICAD) until the end of his term in 2022, said presidential spokesman Salvador Panelo. After 19 days, however, Duterte fired Robredo from her post after stiff opposition from the Duterte administration following her meetings with foreign entities and request for classified drug war information during her tenure as ICAD co-chair.

The Office of the Vice President under Robredo was identified by the Commission on Audit in 2017 for delays in liquidating travel expenses. But for the next four consecutive years (2018–2022), the office received the highest audit rating from the commission.

Policies 
Robredo has spearheaded programs under the Office of the Vice President (OVP). As of January 2022, her flagship anti-poverty program Angat Buhay has benefitted 622,000 families in 223 cities and municipalities across the country since she assumed office in 2016. P520 million worth of aid has been mobilized for the program, mostly from donations by the private sector. The OVP under Robredo has partnered with 372 organizations in the implementation of Angat Buhay. The Angat Buhay program  focuses on six key advocacy areas, namely: public education, rural development, food security and nutrition, women empowerment, universal healthcare, and housing and resettlement.

In October 2017, the Senate increased the 2018 budget of the Office of the Vice President (OVP) by ₱20 million, which was allotted for the vice president's Angat Buhay program. In the same month, Robredo called on fellow Filipinos to remember the 165 soldiers and police who gave their lives for the liberation of Marawi City. Robredo said her office was already preparing to help in the rehabilitation of Marawi City, primarily through its flagship anti-poverty program.

COVID-19 pandemic response 

During the COVID-19 pandemic, the OVP under Robredo provided free shuttle services for pandemic frontline workers, swab tests, telehealth services, and raised funds for relief operations across the country. The office has also delivered 7,350 personal protective equipment (PPEs) to nine hospitals, including the San Lazaro Hospital, the Philippine General Hospital, and the Lung Center of the Philippines. A total of ₱17.3 million was raised for these donations, including food and care packages for the health workers and their families.

2019 Philippine Senate election 

On October 24, 2018, Robredo officially launched the opposition senatorial slate for the 2019 senatorial elections, declaring that 'the opposition is alive.' The opposition candidates ran under the "Otso Diretso" slate, which included former senator Mar Roxas, election lawyer Romulo Macalintal, Mindanao peace advocate Samira Gutoc-Tomawis, human rights lawyer Jose Manuel Diokno, former congressman Erin Tañada, former solicitor general Florin Hilbay, senator Bam Aquino, and Magdalo party-list Rep. Gary Alejano. All Otso Diretso candidates lost the election, the second time that a Liberal Party-led coalition suffered a great loss since 1955.

Fake news 
Robredo has been a constant victim of memes and "fake news" articles since taking office in 2016, some of which she claims emanate from a Senate source. Dealing with these, she said, was a "test of character". Numerous fake news stories have been manufactured on Facebook, Twitter, YouTube, and other blog sites against Robredo after she won the vice presidency in 2016, a portion of which were fabricated by pro-Duterte bloggers. Robredo has demonstrated the falsehood of these statements against her.

During the 2022 Philippine presidential election campaign period, Robredo was the "biggest victim" and target of misinformation reportedly perpetrated by social media supporters of fellow presidential candidate Bongbong Marcos.

Electoral protest 

Robredo's winning margin of 0.61% is the closest margin since Fernando Lopez's victory in the 1965 vice presidential election. Her opponent, Bongbong Marcos, filed an electoral protest on June 29, 2016, a day before inauguration. On February 16, 2021, the PET unanimously dismissed Marcos' electoral protest against Robredo.

2022 presidential campaign 

Robredo officially announced her campaign for president of the Philippines on October 7, 2021, the day she filed her certificate of candidacy before the Commission on Elections as an independent candidate despite her being the party leader of the Liberal Party of the Philippines. Hours after the announcement, a source from Robredo's camp revealed that she had selected senator and Liberal Party president Francis Pangilinan as her running mate.

Robredo placed second in the official tally with 15,035,773 votes, and lost to fellow presidential candidate Bongbong Marcos by a wide margin of over 31 million votes.

Post–vice presidency (2022–present) 
After her term ended, Robredo established a non-governmental organization called Angat Buhay, taking the name and template of the anti-poverty program that she established during her tenure as vice president.

Political positions

Domestic policies

Campaign against illegal drugs 
Robredo has repeatedly expressed her dissent for the government's war on drugs, particularly the policy of Oplan Tokhang. After her short tenure as the co-chairperson of the government's ICAD, she made recommendations to improve the government's campaign against drugs. During her presidential campaign, she vowed to continue intensified efforts against drugs, but would focus on rehabilitation and prevention.

Martial law 
During the Marawi siege, Robredo called for unity as government troops engaged in a firefight against the Maute group in Marawi, and she organized donations and directed relief operations for the victims. She then visited wounded soldiers in Iligan to give support and contributions. Robredo respects President Duterte's implementation of martial law in the whole of Mindanao as a way to combat terrorism, but has requested measures to ensure that the implementation would not resemble the "abuses and violations" during Ferdinand Marcos' implementation of Proclamation No. 1081. She also questioned the coverage and prolongation of the implementation and called on members of the Congress to review and validate the implementation as a "constitutional duty". Robredo said that the martial law in Mindanao has failed to address threats in the region. On November 26, 2019, Robredo called on the government to assure that troop deployments in Samar, Negros, and Bicol would not lead to martial law.

Political dynasties 
Robredo voiced her support for the proposed anti-turncoat law in the House. During her congressional career, she co-authored the Anti-Dynasty Bill.

Foreign policy 
Robredo criticized China for establishing missiles in the South China Sea. She says that China must first recognize the Philippines v. China arbitral ruling before forging any agreement with the Philippines, a position that contrasts with that of Duterte's more diplomatic approach. Robredo called for transparency in government-sponsored deals with China.

Personal life

Leni was married to Jesse Robredo, whom she met while working at the Bicol River Basin Development Program, from 1987 until his death from a plane crash in 2012. The couple has three daughters: Jessica Marie "Aika" Robredo, Janine Patricia "Tricia" Robredo, and Jillian Therese Robredo. Their eldest daughter, Aika, was an executive assistant at the Office of Civil Defense and holds a Master of Public Administration from the Harvard Kennedy School (which Jesse also received from the same school), while their second eldest, Tricia, is a licensed physician and was a UAAP basketball sideline reporter for National University. Their youngest, Jillian, graduated with a Bachelor of Arts degree with a double major in economics and mathematics on a scholarship at New York University.

From May 14, 2017, Robredo has hosted her own public service radio program entitled BISErbisyong LENI, aired on DZXL, until June 26, 2022, after her term end as vice president.

Robredo is fluent in Filipino, English, and her native Central Bikol.

Honors and recognition
On August 1, 2016, Robredo was awarded the Honorary Outstanding Woman Award of the Year 2016 by the Thai government, coinciding with Thailand's Women's Day. The recognition was given to Robredo for her work and advocacy on women's empowerment and gender equality.

On August 23, 2016, Robredo was awarded the Most Influential Filipina Woman of the World award by Filipina Women's Network (FWN), a non-government organization.

In September 2022, Robredo was named as one of Harvard University's Hauser Leaders for Fall 2022.

Four universities have conferred Robredo with honorary doctorates:
 Polytechnic University of the Philippines (2015, Doctor in Public Administration),
 University of Saint Anthony in Iriga, Camarines Sur, her home province (2017, Doctor of Humanities),
 University of the Cordilleras (2017, Doctor of Laws),
 Ateneo de Manila University (2022, Doctor of Philosophy in Economics).

Remembrance
Pathologist Dr. Raymundo Lo named a pink orchid hybrid after Robredo. Rhyncholaeliocattleya Leni Robredo, which was only named upon Robredo's announcement of her candidacy for president in October 2021, was said took seven years to bloom since its pollination from two orchid species. The flower is not yet in commercial production.

In July 2022, the Ateneo de Manila University announced the discovery of two new species of water scavenger beetles. One of them, Anacaena angatbuhay, named after Robredo's Angat Buhay program, had been discovered in Ifugao.

Electoral history

| style="background:#0D5F31;"|
| PFP
| Bongbong Marcos
| style="text-align: right; | 31,629,783
| style="text-align: right; | 58.78%
|-
| style="background:#FE18A3;"|
| Independent
| Leni Robredo
| style="text-align: right; | 15,035,773
| style="text-align: right; | 27.94%
|-
! style="background:#000040;" |
| PROMDI
| Manny Pacquiao
| style="text-align: right; | 3,663,113
| style="text-align: right; | 6.81%
|-
! style="background:#9683EC;" |
| Aksyon
| Isko Moreno
| style="text-align: right; | 1,933,909
| style="text-align: right; | 3.59%
|-
! style="background:#CD5C5C;" |
| Independent
| Panfilo Lacson
| style="text-align: right; | 892,375
| style="text-align: right; | 1.66%
|-
! style="background:#D2691E;" |
| KTPNAN
| Faisal Mangondato
| style="text-align: right; | 301,629
| style="text-align: right; | 0.56%
|-
! style="background:#DCDCDC;" |
| Independent
| Ernesto Abella
| style="text-align: right; | 114,627
| style="text-align: right; | 0.21%
|-
! style="background:#0E2864;" |
| PLM
| Leody de Guzman
| style="text-align: right; | 93,027
| style="text-align: right; | 0.17%
|-
! style="background:#CD5C5C;" |
| PDSP
| Norberto Gonzales
| style="text-align: right; | 90,656
| style="text-align: right; | 0.17%
|-
! style="background:#0054A5;" |
| DPP
| Jose Montemayor Jr.
| style="text-align: right; | 60,592
| style="text-align: right; | 0.11%
|-

See also

 List of Leni Robredo 2022 presidential campaign endorsements
 Wiktionary:kakampink

References

External links

 
 Profile at the House of Representatives of the Philippines
 Profile at Bayang Matuwid

1965 births
Living people
Bicolano people
21st-century Filipino politicians
21st-century Filipino women politicians
Bicolano politicians
21st-century Roman Catholics
Chairpersons of the Housing and Urban Development Coordinating Council of the Philippines
Candidates in the 2016 Philippine vice-presidential election
Candidates in the 2022 Philippine presidential election
Duterte administration cabinet members
Filipino radio personalities
Filipino women lawyers
Filipino YouTubers
Liberal Party (Philippines) politicians
Members of the House of Representatives of the Philippines from Camarines Sur
People from Naga, Camarines Sur
University of the Philippines Diliman alumni
Vice presidents of the Philippines
Women members of the Cabinet of the Philippines
Women members of the House of Representatives of the Philippines
Women vice presidents
Independent politicians in the Philippines